Tobacco Road is a 1966 album by organist Brother Jack McDuff which was his second release on the Atlantic label.

Reception
Allmusic awarded the album 4 stars stating "Tobacco Road stands out from the pack... no matter what format, the tunes are given fantastically funked-up treatments that sound surprisingly natural".

Track listing 
All compositions by Jack McDuff except as indicated
 "Teardrops from My Eyes" (Rudy Toombs) - 2:04    
 "Tobacco Road" (John D. Loudermilk) - 2:56    
 "The Shadow of Your Smile" (Johnny Mandel, Paul Francis Webster) - 3:52    
 "Can't Get Satisfied" - 5:11    
 "Blowin' in the Wind" (Bob Dylan) - 2:39    
 "And the Angels Sing" (Ziggy Elman, Johnny Mercer) - 4:11    
 "This Bitter Earth" (Clyde Otis) - 2:36    
 "Alexander's Ragtime Band" (Irving Berlin) - 5:55    
 "Wade in the Water" - 4:36  
Recorded at Chess Studios in Chicago on August 22 (tracks 1, 2, 5 & 7) and August 23 (tracks 3, 4, 6, 8 & 9), 1966.

Personnel 
Jack McDuff - organ, arranger
Fred Berry, King Kolax - trumpet (tracks 1, 2, 5 & 7)
John Watson - trombone (tracks 1, 2, 5 & 7)
Red Holloway - tenor saxophone (tracks 1, 2, 5 & 7)
Danny Turner - tenor saxophone, flute (tracks 3, 4, 6, 8 & 9)
Lonnie Simmons - baritone saxophone (tracks 1, 2, 5 & 7)
Bobby Christian - vibraphone, percussion (tracks 1, 2, 5 & 7)
Roland Faulkner (tracks 1, 2, 5 & 7), Calvin Green (tracks 3, 4, 6, 8 & 9) - guitar 
Loyal J. Gresham - electric bass (tracks 1, 2, 5 & 7)
Joe Dukes (tracks 3, 4, 6, 8 & 9), Bob Guthrie (tracks 1, 2, 5 & 7) - drums
J. J. Jackson - arranger, conductor (tracks 1, 2, 5 & 7)

References 

)

Jack McDuff albums
1966 albums
Atlantic Records albums